The Estonian Riigikogu, or Parliament, is made up of 101 members, elected from 12 separate geographic areas, or electoral districts. The constituency division is based on the counties of Estonia, of which some are combined or divided depending on the size of the population. The capital city Tallinn is divided into three electoral districts based on administrative districts within the city. In the elections to the European Parliament, Estonia has only one national electoral district.

Map of electoral districts

References

 
Estonia
Estonia politics-related lists